In Middle Age Communes in Italy, a broletto was the place where the whole population met for democratic assemblies, and where the elected men lived and administered justice.

Broletto is an ancient Italian word, from medieval Latin "broilum, brogilum", which probably derives from a Celtic word. Its first meaning is "little orchard or garden"; hence the meaning "field surrounded by a wall".

Ancient brolettoes are major buildings in Milan, Brescia, Pavia, Piacenza, Como, Monza, Reggio Emilia, Novara and others.  Several places or buildings in northern Italy are called "Broletto".

Gallery

List 
 Broletto, Arona in Arona, province of Novara
  in Bergamo
 Broletto, Brescia
  in Como
 In Cremona, two examples of broletti:
 the Guelph 
 the Ghibelline Palazzo del Comune (Cremona)
  in Lodi
 Palazzo del Podestà, Mantua
 In Milan:
 Palazzo della Ragione, Milan or Broletto Nuovo, one of three broletti
 , formerly Broletto Nuovissimo, today hosting the Piccolo Teatro (Milan)
 Arengario (Monza)
  in Novara
 Broletto, Orta or Palazzo della Comunità, in Orta San Giulio, province of Novara
 Broletto, Pavia in Pavia
 Broletto, Perugia in Perugia, current seat of the Umbria region
 Palazzo Comunale, Piacenza, or il Gotico
 Broletto, Reggio Emilia in Reggio Emilia
  in Rimini

See also 
 Arengario and Arengo
 Palazzo Comunale (disambiguation)
 Palazzo del Podesta (disambiguation)
 Palazzo Pretorio (disambiguation)
 Palazzo della Ragione (disambiguation)

References

Architecture in Italy
Medieval Italy